Tămășeni is a commune in Neamț County, Western Moldavia, Romania. It is composed of two villages, Adjudeni (Dzsidafalva) and Tămășeni.

At the 2002 census, 99.9% of inhabitants were ethnic Romanians. 99% were Roman Catholic and 0.8% Romanian Orthodox.

Adjudeni village is the site of a monumental Roman Catholic church.

References 

Communes in Neamț County
Localities in Western Moldavia